John Keen may refer to:

Speedy Keen (1945–2002), British musician
John Keen (cyclist) (1849–1902), British professional cyclist and manufacturer of bicycles
John Keen (Kenya politician), member of Kenya African National Union
John Keen (Canadian politician), speaker of the Legislative Assembly of British Columbia (1918–1920)
John Henry Keen (1851–1950), Anglican missionary in Canada

See also
John Keene (disambiguation)
John Kean (disambiguation)
John Keane (disambiguation)